AM-7438 is a drug which is a cannabinoid receptor agonist, developed by the research team led by Dr Alexandros Makriyannis. It is a derivative of Δ8-THC which has been substituted with a side chain containing a metabolically labile ester group, allowing the molecule to be rapidly metabolised to an inactive form, in a similar manner to drugs such as remifentanil, remimazolam and SN 35210. This means that while AM-7438 retains potent cannabinoid effects, it has a much shorter duration of action than most related compounds.

References 

Benzochromenes
Primary alcohols
Phenols
AM cannabinoids